Jan Højland Nielsen (born 15 January 1952) is a Danish former professional footballer who played as a midfielder or sweeper. He made five appearances for the Denmark national team from 1974 to 1978.

References

External links
 

1952 births
Living people
Sportspeople from Frederiksberg
Danish men's footballers
Association football midfielders
Association football defenders
Denmark international footballers
Bundesliga players
2. Bundesliga players
Boldklubben af 1893 players
TSV 1860 Munich players
Kjøbenhavns Boldklub players
Danish expatriate men's footballers
Danish expatriate sportspeople in Germany
Expatriate footballers in Germany